Major-General Htin Latt Oo is a Burmese military officer and current commander of Myanmar's Western Command, which encompasses Rakhine and Chin States.

Military career 
Htin Latt Oo served as the commandant of the Defence Services Academy until July 2020, when he was appointed as commander of Myanmar's Western Command, succeeding Phone Myat. He is currently leading the military's efforts to combat an insurgency by the Arakan Army in Rakhine State. He has been sanctioned by the European Union, Switzerland, and Canada for violating human rights and committing crimes against civilians in the Western Command.

See also 
 Conflict in Rakhine State (2016–present)
 State Administration Council
 Tatmadaw

References 

Living people
Burmese generals
Year of birth missing (living people)